The Battle of Lyuban, Lyuban offensive operation or Battle of the Volkhov (7 January 1942 – 30 April 1942) (Russian: Любанская наступательная операция; German: Schlacht am Wolchow) was a Soviet offensive operation of World War II. It was conducted by the Volkhov and Leningrad Fronts of the Red Army with the goal of relieving the siege of Leningrad and encircling and destroying the German forces carrying out the siege.

The offensive used no tanks because of the terrain, therefore it was down to the infantry and the artillery. The attacking Soviet forces found themselves under intense fire from German defensive positions, and the Red Army lacked proper artillery support against the German lines. The offensive stalled and the Soviets went over to the defensive. Field Marshal Georg von Küchler counterattacked with an operation called 'Wild Beast" (Operation Raubtier) and the Soviet 2nd Shock Army was cut off and surrounded. It was destroyed in June 1942 and its commander Andrey Vlasov was taken prisoner.

Aftermath

Analysis
The Volkhov and Leningrad Fronts lacked the armored vehicles, artillery ammunition, manpower reserves, fuel and food to mount sustained offensive operations against the German 18th Army. Inadequate Soviet firepower could not reduce the German system of fortified strongpoints in the forests. The Germans inflicted heavy losses on the attacking Soviet forces and forced the exhausted Red Army to the defensive. According to general Mikhail Khozin, Soviet armored forces and artillery firepower did not exist in sufficient quantities to exploit penetrations and defeat German counterattacks.

Casualties
Out of 327,700 men deployed into battle from 7 January – 30 April 1942, the Volkhov Front lost 308,367, including 95,064 killed or missing and 213,303 wounded or sick.

Citations

Bibliography

 
 

Lyuban
1942 in the Soviet Union